CFRZ-FM is a radio station which broadcasts a First Nations community radio format on the frequency of 98.3 MHz (FM) in Walpole Island, Ontario, Canada.

History
On November 4, 2011, Director of Operations of Walpole Island First Nation Radio received an approval from the Canadian Radio-television and Telecommunications Commission (CRTC) to operate a new First Nations community radio station at Walpole Island.

References

External links
 

Frz
Frz
Radio stations established in 2011
Radio stations in Lambton County
2011 establishments in Ontario